Yana Valerievna Shcherban (born 6 September 1989) is a Russian volleyball player, who plays as an outside hitter. She is a member of the Russia women's national volleyball team and participated at the 2011 Summer Universiade in China, the 2014 Montreux Volley Masters, the FIVB Volleyball World Grand Prix (in 2009, 2014, 2015, 2016), the 2014 FIVB Volleyball Women's World Championship in Italy, the 2015 Women's European Volleyball Championship in Belgium and the Netherlands, the 2015 FIVB Volleyball Women's World Cup in Japan, and the 2016 Summer Olympics in Brazil.

At club level she played for AES Balakovo, Universitet Vizit, Proton Balakovo and Dinamo Krasnodar before moving to Dinamo Moscow in 2014.

Awards

Individuals
 2014 Montreux Volley Masters "Best Receiver"

National team

Junior
 2011 Universiade –  Bronze medal

Senior
 2009 FIVB World Grand Prix –  Silver medal
 2014 Montreux Volley Masters –  Bronze medal
 2014 FIVB World Grand Prix –  Bronze medal
 2015 FIVB World Grand Prix –  Silver medal
 2015 European Championship –  Gold medal

Clubs
 2012–13 CEV Challenge Cup –  Gold medal (with Dinamo Krasnodar)
 2014–15 Russian Championship –  Silver medal (with Dinamo Moscow)
 2015–16 Russian Championship –  Gold medal (with Dinamo Moscow)
 2016 Russian Cup –  Silver medal (with Dinamo Moscow)
 2016–17 Russian Championship –  Gold medal (with Dinamo Moscow)

References

External links
FIVB profile
Profile at CEV

1989 births
Living people
Russian women's volleyball players
Sportspeople from Bishkek
Olympic volleyball players of Russia
Volleyball players at the 2016 Summer Olympics
Universiade medalists in volleyball
Universiade bronze medalists for Russia
Medalists at the 2011 Summer Universiade